Cocaine dependence is a neurological disorder that is characterized by withdrawal symptoms upon cessation from cocaine use. It also often coincides with cocaine addiction which is a biopsychosocial disorder characterized by persistent use of cocaine and/or crack despite substantial harm and adverse consequences. The Diagnostic and Statistical Manual of Mental Disorders (5th ed., abbreviated DSM-5), classifies problematic cocaine use as a "Stimulant use disorder". The International Classification of Diseases (11th rev., abbreviated ICD-11), includes "Cocaine dependence" as a classification (diagnosis) under "Disorders due to use of cocaine".

The use of cocaine creates euphoria and high amounts of energy. If taken in large doses, it is possible to cause mood swings, paranoia, insomnia, psychosis, high blood pressure, a fast heart rate, panic attacks, seizures that are extremely difficult to control, cognitive impairments and drastic changes in personality. Cocaine overdose may result in cardiovascular and brain damage, such as: status epilepticus, constricting blood vessels in the brain, causing strokes and constricting arteries in the heart; causing heart attacks.

The symptoms of cocaine withdrawal range from moderate to severe: dysphoria, depression, anxiety, decreased libido, psychological and physical weakness, pain, and compulsive cravings.

Signs and symptoms
Cocaine is a powerful stimulant known to make users feel energetic, cheerful, talkative, etc. In time, negative side effects include increased body temperature, irregular or rapid heart rate, high blood pressure, increased risk of heart attacks, strokes and even sudden death from cardiac arrest. Many people who habitually use cocaine develop a transient, manic-like condition similar to amphetamine psychosis and schizophrenia, whose symptoms include aggression, severe paranoia, restlessness, confusion and tactile hallucinations; which can include the feeling of something crawling under the skin (formication), also known as "coke bugs", during binges.  Different ingestion techniques have their own symptoms that accompany them. Snorting it can cause a loss of sense of smell, nose bleeds, problems swallowing and an inflamed, runny nose. Smoking it causes lung damage and injecting it puts users at risk of contracting infectious diseases like HIV and hepatitis C. Heavy users of cocaine have also reported having thoughts of suicide, unusual weight loss, trouble maintaining relationships, and an unhealthy, pale appearance.

Withdrawal symptoms
When used habitually, cocaine, because of its highly addictive nature, can change brain structure and function. Circuits within the brain structure, that play a part in stress signals become more sensitive. When cocaine is not being used this increases an individual's displeasure and negative moods. In 1986, Gawin and Kleber led an important study on the withdrawal symptoms of cocaine users. In this study, three distinct phases were reported. These phases are the 'crash', 'withdrawal' and 'extinction'. The 'crash' phase or phase 1 occurs directly after cocaine is not being used anymore. Withdrawal symptoms for this phase are exhaustion, hypersomnia, no cravings to use, dysthymia, increased appetite, restlessness, and irritability. The second phase, or 'withdrawal' phase occurs 1–10 weeks after cocaine users quit, symptoms include: lethargy, anxiety, erratic sleep, strong craving, emotional lability, irritability, depression, poor concentration, and bowel issues. Finally the last phase or the 'extinction' phase occurs up to 28 weeks after discontinued use, symptoms include: episodic cravings and some dysphoria.

Epidemiology and prevalence rates 
In the United States, past year cocaine users in 2019 was 5.5 million for people aged 12 or older. When broken into age groups, ages 12–17 had 97,000 users; ages 18–25 had 1.8 million users and ages 26 or older had 3.6 million users.

Past year cocaine users with a cocaine use disorder in 2019 was 1 million for people aged 12 or older. When broken into age groups, ages 12–17 had 5,000 people with a cocaine use disorder; ages 18–25 had 250,000 people with a cocaine use disorder and ages 26 or older had 756,000 people with a cocaine use disorder

In the United States, cocaine use overdose deaths have been on the rise and in 2019, the CDC reported over 16,000 deaths from cocaine overdose.

Risk
A study consisting of 1,081 U.S. residents who had first used cocaine within the previous 24 months was conducted. It was found that the risk of becoming dependent on cocaine within two years of first use was 5–6%. The risk of becoming dependent within 10 years of first use increased to 15–16%. These were the aggregate rates for all types of use considered, such as smoking, snorting, and injecting. Among recent-onset users individual rates of dependency were higher for smoking (3.4 times) and much higher for injecting. Women were 3.3 times more likely to become dependent, compared with men. Users who started at ages 12 or 13 were four times as likely to become dependent compared to those who started between ages 18 and 20.

However, a study of non-deviant users in Amsterdam found a "relative absence of destructive and compulsive use patterns over a ten year period" and concluded that cocaine users can and do exercise control. "Our respondents applied two basic types of controls to themselves: 1) restricting use to certain situations and to emotional states in which cocaine's effects would be most positive, and 2) limiting mode of ingestion to snorting of modest amounts of cocaine, staying below 2.5 grams a week for some, and below 0.5 grams a week for most. Nevertheless, those whose use level exceeded 2.5 grams a week all returned to lower levels".

Treatment

Therapy
Twelve-step programs such as Cocaine Anonymous (modeled on Alcoholics Anonymous) have been widely used to help those with cocaine addiction. Cognitive behavioral therapy (CBT), dialectical behavior therapy (DBT), rational emotive behavior therapy (REBT), and motivational interviewing (MI) can be especially powerful approaches to treating cocaine addiction. Cognitive behavioral therapy (CBT) combined with motivational therapy (MT) have proven to be more helpful than 12 step programs in treating cocaine dependency. However, both these approaches have a fairly low success rate as research suggests that the withdrawal symptoms can last for several weeks. For instance, one of the main predictors of a successful recovery is dependent on the number of continuous days a user is able to stay off of the substance. Alternative holistic treatments such as physical exercise and Meditation has been proven effective in reducing cocaine cravings. Other non-pharmacological treatments such as acupuncture and hypnosis have been explored, but without conclusive results.

Medications
Numerous medications have been investigated for use in cocaine dependence, but , none of them were considered to be effective.  Anticonvulsants, such as carbamazepine, gabapentin, lamotrigine, and topiramate, do not appear to be effective as treatment. Limited evidence suggests that antipsychotics are also ineffective for treatment of cocaine dependence. Few studies have examined bupropion (a novel antidepressant) for cocaine dependence; however, trials performed thus far have not shown it to be an effective form of treatment for this purpose.

The National Institute on Drug Abuse (NIDA) of the U.S. National Institutes of Health is researching modafinil, a narcolepsy drug and mild stimulant, as a potential cocaine treatment. Ibogaine has been under investigation as a treatment for cocaine dependency and is used in clinics in Mexico, the Netherlands and Canada. It was legal for a time in Costa Rica, but has been illegal since 2018. It is illegal to use in many countries, such as Sweden, Norway, the United Kingdom, and in the United States. Other medications that have been investigated for this purpose include acetylcysteine, baclofen, and vanoxerine. Medications such as phenelzine, have been used to cause an "aversion reaction" when administered with cocaine.

Vaccine
TA-CD is an active vaccine developed by the Xenova Group which is used to negate the effects of cocaine, making it suitable for use in treatment of addiction. It is created by combining norcocaine with inactivated cholera toxin.

Research
Transcranial magnetic stimulation (TMS) is being studied as a treatment for cocaine addiction, although definitive evidence for efficacy does not yet exist.

Other research on rodents has suggested that cocaine use leads to complexes of dopamine transporters, which build up tolerance to the drug. It's possible that future treatment for cocaine addiction might target those complexes.

See also
 SB-277011-A – a dopamine D3 receptor antagonist, used in the study of cocaine addiction. Where cocaine reduces the threshold for brain electrical self-stimulation in rats, an indication of cocaine's rewarding effects, SB-277011-A completely reverses this effect.

Notes

References

Reference notes

External links 

Cocaine
Substance dependence

de:Kokain#Kokainismus